Krakowskie Przedmieście (literally: Cracow Fore-town), often abbreviated to Krakowskie, is one of the best known and most prestigious streets of Poland's capital Warsaw, surrounded by historic palaces, churches and manor-houses. Krakowskie Przedmieście Royal Avenue constitutes the northernmost part of Warsaw's Royal Route, and links the Old Town and Royal Castle (at Castle Square) with some of the most notable institutions in Warsaw, including – proceeding southward – the Presidential Palace, Warsaw University, and the Polish Academy of Sciences headquartered in the Staszic Palace.  The immediate southward extension of Krakowskie Przedmieście along the Royal Route is ulica Nowy Świat (New World Street).

Several other Polish cities also have streets named Krakowskie Przedmieście. In Lublin, it is the main and most elegant street. Other cities include Piotrków Trybunalski, Bochnia, Krasnystaw, Olkusz, Sieradz and Wieluń.

History
Krakowskie Przedmieście was established in the 15th century as a trade route. It is one of the oldest avenues in Warsaw and the first part of the Royal Route that connects the Royal Castle with King John III Sobieski's 17th century Wilanów Palace at the southern periphery. In the 17th century, palaces and manor houses began springing up along what had by then become the major artery of the new Polish capital. 

During the 18th century, the Italian painter Bernardo Bellotto (better known in Central Europe as "Canaletto"), a court painter to Poland's last king, Stanisław August Poniatowski, rendered in meticulous detail the streets and architecture of Poland's capital, with its burgeoning population, strong economy, and seats of learning and the arts. It was partly thanks to his paintings that Warsaw's historic district was accurately rebuilt by the Polish people from its deliberate destruction by German special squads in  World War II, especially following the Warsaw Uprising in 1944.

By the 19th century, Krakowskie Przedmieście had many Baroque and Classical-style churches, palaces and dwellings. The street's development continued into the 20th century with the erection of commercial buildings and hotels such as the Hotel Bristol.

More recently, the architect Krzysztof Domaradzki of the Dawos studio has given the street a new redesign. He was inspired by historical sources and Bernardo Bellotto's hyper-realistic paintings of the 18th century street to give the area a look that is both old and modern.

Features
A stone Madonna and child, the "Madonna of Passau," stands at Krakowskie Przedmieście, opposite the end of Bednarska Street. It was created by royal sculptor Józef Belotti and placed at its present site in 1683 as a votive offering for King John III Sobieski's victory over the Turks at Vienna. The statue is Warsaw's second oldest monument after Zygmunt's Column.

Trębacka Street leads to the Adam Mickiewicz monument, which was erected in 1898 on the 100th anniversary of the birth of Poland's great poet. In 1942 the Germans destroyed the statue. Only the head and a fragment of the torso were recovered for its postwar reconstruction.

In accordance with Frédéric Chopin's will, after his death his heart was removed and brought by his sister in an urn to Warsaw, where it was deposited inside a pillar of the Holy Cross Church on Krakowskie Przedmieście.

References

In-line:

Gallery

Paintings by Canaletto

Bronze monuments

External links

 Krakowskie Przedmieście Street 

Streets in Warsaw